Green Arrow, a DC Comics superhero, has appeared in media other than comic books since 1973, including animated shows, live-action productions, and video games.

Television

Animated

Super Friends
The first television appearance of Green Arrow was a guest spot in an episode of the original incarnation of Super Friends. He appeared in the 1973 episode "Gulliver's Gigantic Goof" and was voiced by Norman Alden. He was referred to as a "staunch member of the Justice League of America" (JLA).

Justice League Unlimited

Green Arrow makes numerous appearances in Justice League Unlimited, voiced by Kin Shriner. He was the first new hero introduced in the revamped series in the episode "Initiation". In this version, Green Arrow is reluctant to join the League to avoid distractions from his primary goal: protecting "the little guy": he prefers to fight muggers and thieves, over supervillains and alien invaders. However, his strong left-wing political convictions (showcased by his quote "I'm an old lefty") and sometimes irreverent advocacy are key reasons the Justice League insists on recruiting him as a prominent voice of the team. His counsel is critical in preventing the Justice League from overreacting to their apparent enemies' machinations and thus setting on a path towards becoming a version of the totalitarian Justice Lords during the Project Cadmus incident, and also from disbanding the League when they were later cleared of wrongdoing. Ironically, the disbanding speech is given by Superman, who had been the one who wanted the League not to disband after only one mission, and coined the team's name as the "Justice League".

In this version, Green Arrow is a billionaire who sold his company to devote time to his volunteering and activism. He develops a romantic relationship with Black Canary over the course of the series. He also develops a close friendship with Supergirl since they first met as he always helps her whenever she needs it and enjoys spending time with her. Speedy makes one appearance during the show in the episode "Patriot Act". While Green Arrow refers to Speedy as his "ex-sidekick", Speedy prefers the term "ex-partner".

The Batman
Green Arrow first appeared in the season five episode "Vertigo", voiced by Chris Hardwick. This version of Green Arrow is motivated largely by a desire for revenge against Count Vertigo, a former employee who used technology stolen from his company to strand him on a desert island. He is also prominent in the series finale, "Lost Heroes", which reveals his frustrations at being ignored in favor of the super-powered members of the League.

Batman: The Brave and the Bold

Green Arrow appears in Batman: The Brave and the Bold, voiced by James Arnold Taylor with a design that resembles his Golden and Silver Age interpretations. He is often portrayed as Batman's friendly rival. They are trapped together by Clock King in the first episode, but escape and defeat the villain. Merlin calls upon them in "Day of the Dark Knight!" to restore Camelot and bring King Arthur back to the throne; they succeed and are nearly knighted before they begin arguing, resulting in Merlin sending them back to their own time. There are also romantic rivalries as Green Arrow shows disgust at Batman's flirting with Catwoman and blames him for her escape; Green Arrow later makes efforts to gain Black Canary's affection despite her attraction to Batman. His Crime Syndicate counterpart appears in episode "Deep Cover for Batman" and is named Blue Bowman.

DC Showcase: Green Arrow
DC Showcase: Green Arrow, an animated short directed by Joaquim Dos Santos and written by Greg Weisman, was included on the DVD for the direct-to-video film Superman/Batman: Apocalypse. Actor Neal McDonough voices Green Arrow. In the short, Oliver Queen is picking up Dinah Lance at the Star City Airport with the intention of proposing to her. However, he sees Merlyn entering the airport. He saves the princess of Vlatava from the League of Assassins, battling them and Merlyn through the airport. The girl confirms that her father was killed the night before and that her uncle is Count Vertigo, who Green Arrow believes hired Merlyn. Green Arrow defeats Merlyn in a duel. Vertigo then appears and nearly kills Arrow, but Black Canary uses her "canary cry" to defeat him. Arrow then proposes and Canary accepts, the short ending with their passionate kiss.

Young Justice

Green Arrow appears as a member of the JLA in Young Justice, voiced by Alan Tudyk. In the pilot episode "Independence Day", Green Arrow and Speedy are late to a sidekick induction ceremony at the Hall of Justice, and Speedy mistakenly believes he will not be made an official JLA member and angrily denounces Green Arrow. Green Arrow appears again in "Infiltrator" with new sidekick Artemis, who claims to be his niece. When the villainous Light takes control of the Justice League, Green Arrow and others try to hunt and kill their apprentices. Green Arrow returns in "Salvage" to confront Red Arrow over his obsession with finding the original Speedy. When Red Arrow succeeds, Speedy is angry with Green Arrow for giving up on him. In Young Justice: Outsiders, which is set two years later, he resigns from the Justice League in a pre-planned move to interfere in metahuman trafficking as vigilantes with Batman, their proteges and other Justice League members. He attended Superboy and Miss Martian's wedding in the season four finale.

Mad
Green Arrow appears in the animated sketch comedy series Mad where he tries to appeal to Superman, Batman, and Wonder Woman about being called "Super Friends".

DC Nation Shorts
Green Arrow appears in one of the DC Nation Shorts on Cartoon Network, voiced by Will Friedle.

Vixen
Green Arrow (voiced by Stephen Amell) appears in the animated web series Vixen, set in the shared universe called Arrowverse.

Justice League Action
Green Arrow appears in Justice League Action, with Chris Diamantopoulos reprising his role from various DC media.

DC Super Hero Girls
Green Arrow appears in DC Super Hero Girls, voiced by Eddie Perino. In this version, he is the onstage nemesis of Zatanna and member of the Invincibros.

Batwheels
Green Arrow will appear in Batwheels, voiced by MacLeod Andrews.

Live-action

Smallville

Green Arrow/Oliver Queen made his live-action debut on The CW series Smallville, played by Justin Hartley. Oliver appears near the end of the Season 6 episode "Sneeze", arriving at Metropolis to investigate LuthorCorp. Lois Lane ended up briefly being his love interest before he departed in the episode "Justice".  Oliver briefly reappeared twice in the following season's episodes "Siren" and "Veritas", before becoming a series regular from Season 8 onwards.

Due to the Batman embargo that Warner Bros. laid down to protect Christopher Nolan's Batman movie franchise, Smallvilles version of Green Arrow seems to be an amalgamation of the DC Comics' Oliver Queen and Bruce Wayne, who is more of an anti-hero committing morally challenged acts in order to reach his goals (most notably blowing up Lex Luthor's medical transport) under the belief that the ends justify the means, but after a rough start becomes a trusted ally and close friend of Clark Kent.  Smallvilles Green Arrow retains his many unique arrows and demonstrates expert archery skill, along with the skilled use of a retractable crossbow. He makes extensive use of an adapted PSE Archery compound bow, shot using fingers rather than an archery tab or release aid, although his gauntlets serve as both a shooting glove and an armguard.  He was also given a more modern costume that had special equipment designed by his corporation, Queen Industries.  As in the comics, Oliver meets the female superhero Black Canary in Season 7, whom he recruits into his vigilante team, and it is hinted in the Season 9 episode "Absolute Justice" that the two have had a romantic relationship, and Mia Dearden refers to Black Canary as Oliver's "not quite ex-girlfriend", indicating they broke up at some point but still have unresolved feelings.

Oliver returns as a regular ensemble cast in Season 8, where flashback sequences to his origin story marooned on a desert island were shown.  After learning that Lionel Luthor murdered his parents, Oliver abandoned his heroic persona and only rethought his role as Green Arrow when helping Clark keep his identity secret. His battle with Lex Luthor concluded in "Requiem" when he became a majority shareholder of LuthorCorp, which effectively became a subsidiary of Queen Industries. However, he narrowly survived a bomb planted by a disgrunted ex-employee instigated by Lex, and Oliver uses another bomb to murder Lex. In the season finale Oliver and his team capture David Bloome, whose Doomsday persona separates and escapes, injuring the others.  Clark eventually defeats Doomsday by burying him a mile underground, but Oliver's friend Jimmy Olsen was mortally wounded by Bloome, and the group leave Metropolis while feeling responsible for Olsen's death.

In Season 9, Oliver's life begins to fall apart, and following an argument with Clark he burns his Green Arrow costume. He reaches his lowest point in "Echo", when Queen Industries is on the edge of bankruptcy. Tess Mercer gets Oliver to raise shareholder confidence, but Oliver remained depressed enough to attempt suicide with a fake bomb left by an adversary. After talking with Clark, Oliver becomes fearful of following the same path as Lex. In the episode "Roulette", Chloe Sullivan recruits the femme fatale Victoria Sinclair to set up a ruse to help re-ignite Oliver's a heroic spirit, and he agrees to become the Green Arrow again. In the following episode "Crossfire", he offers to help train Mia Dearden.  It is also hinted later that he and Chloe became lovers at the end of the episode "Warrior".

With his secret about to be revealed in the Seasons 10 episode "Supergirl", Oliver announced to the press that he was Green Arrow and became the public face of superhero vigilantes to mitigate the public backlash being created by the Darkness. Oliver is briefly corrupted by Darkseid but resists his influence long enough for Clark to cure him.  He marries Chloe in the episode "Fortune", and it is suggested in the series finale that they later had a child together.  The eighth issue of the show's comic book continuation Smallville Season Eleven written by executive story editor Bryan Q. Miller, confirms that the child is Oliver's son as Chloe announces her pregnancy to him. After the Monitor crisis, he and Chloe named their newborn son "Jonathan" after Clark's late adoptive father, and Oliver was recruited into the Department of Extranormal Operations by Steve Trevor.

Arrowverse
 

On January 18, 2012, The CW green-lit a pilot for a proposed Green Arrow series with Greg Berlanti, Marc Guggenheim and Andrew Kreisberg producing. The series, Arrow, offers a fresh take on the character, and initially does not feature superpowers, as a way to take a realistic look at the characters in this universe. In addition to the character's experiences as the hero Green Arrow, the series also features flashbacks to Oliver's time on the island and the events that shaped him into the hero in the present. Stephen Amell portrays Oliver Queen in the series. It premiered in North America on October 10, 2012, and has aired six seasons. On April 2, 2018, The CW renewed the series for a seventh season. Oliver Queen has made multiple appearances in the Arrow spin-offs The Flash, Legends of Tomorrow and Supergirl with Stephen Amell reprising the role. Those series are set in a shared universe called the Arrowverse.
 In the second season of The Flash, the Earth-2 version of Robert Queen is the Arrow after his son Oliver Queen's death, similar to Batman's reversal in Flashpoint. By Arrow's eighth season, Adrian Chase has taken up the mantle of the Hood and later became Green Arrow on Earth-2 after Oliver adjusted the name. In the crossover event "Crisis on Infinite Earths", Oliver choose his daughter Mia Smoak as the new Green Arrow in which she became in the episode "Green Arrow and the Canaries".

Stargirl
In the Stargirl episode, "Brainwave", Pat Dugan shows the titular character a photo of him and the Star-Spangled Kid with Seven Soldiers of Victory members Green Arrow, Speedy, Vigilante, Shining Knight, Crimson Avenger, and Wing.

Peacemaker
Green Arrow is mentioned in the Peacemaker season finale episode "It's Cow or Never", confirming his existence in the DCEU.

Film

Animated

Justice League: The New Frontier
Green Arrow appears in Justice League: The New Frontier, resembling his Golden Age version.

Justice League: Crisis on Two Earths
An alternate-universe version of Green Arrow named Archer appears in Justice League: Crisis on Two Earths, voiced by Jim Meskimen. He was first seen on a computer page. Next he is seen providing security at a shipment being made by Johnny Quick with alternate versions of Black Canary and Lobo. He attacks Flash but is defeated by Martian Manhunter. Later, he tried to kill an alternate Rose Wilson for speaking against the Crime Syndicate. But Martian Manhunter stops him and hands him over to the police.

Batman: The Dark Knight Returns
Oliver Queen appears in the second part of the animated adaptation of The Dark Knight Returns, voiced by Robin Atkin Downes.

Lego DC Comics Super Heroes: Justice League vs. Bizarro League
Green Arrow appears in Lego DC Comics Super Heroes: Justice League vs. Bizarro League, voiced by Phil Morris.

Batman Unlimited
Green Arrow appears in Batman Unlimited: Animal Instincts, Batman Unlimited: Monster Mayhem, and Batman Unlimited: Mechs vs. Mutants, voiced by Chris Diamantopoulos.

The Lego Batman Movie
Green Arrow makes an appearance in The Lego Batman Movie where he is seen with the Justice League.

Teen Titans Go! To the Movies
The Green Arrow makes a cameo appearance in Teen Titans Go! To the Movies.

Batman: The Long Halloween, Part 2

In a post-credits scene at the end of Batman: The Long Halloween - Part Two, the Flash and Green Arrow knock at the front door to Wayne Manor, where they were both greeted by Alfred Pennyworth.

Injustice
Green Arrow appeared in Injustice, voiced by Reid Scott.

Green Lantern: Beware My Power
Green Arrow appears in Green Lantern: Beware My Power, voiced by Jimmi Simpson

Live-action

Escape from Super Max
David S. Goyer and Justin Marks penned a script for a film starring Green Arrow originally called Super Max. On June 5, 2008, the film was retitled Green Arrow: Escape from Super Max. The reported storyline stated that the hero, who was framed for a crime he did not commit, must escape a high-security prison filled with A-, B-, and C-list villains and rogue superheroes.

In an interview with MTV in 2008, Marks said: 
It's a very, very awesome prison. I majored in architecture in college, and design is how I actually started in. For Super Max, designing that prison, it had to be the kind of thing that was a character in and of itself. We're in a world where instead of just trying to contain a guy who's really big, you're trying to contain a guy who canin the case of Iciclewho can freeze things. What kind of a cell would a guy like that need in order to have his powers neutralized? So to escape from Super Max they have got to go through the most elaborate heist we've ever seen, involving superpowers. Because the prison itself kind of has superpowers!

Marks added that Black Canary would not be making an appearance in the film, and that it would include cameos from the Riddler, Lex Luthor, and the Joker.

Elements of the script were adapted for the seventh season of Arrow, where Oliver Queen is locked in the Slabside Maximum Security Prison after being outed as the Green Arrow.

DC Extended Universe
Stephen Amell, who portrays the character on Arrow, stated in July 2013 that he was interested in portraying the character in the Justice League film. However, DC has consistently denied any continuity between the cinematic universe and the TV universe, which began with Arrow.

Video games
 Justice League Task Force
 Justice League Heroes (voiced by Ralph Garman)
 Batman: The Brave and the Bold – The Videogame (voiced by James Arnold Taylor)
 DC Universe Online (voiced by David Jennison)
 Lego Batman 2: DC Super Heroes (portable versions)
 Infinite Crisis (Alan Tudyk reprising the role)
 Lego Batman 3: Beyond Gotham (Stephen Amell reprising the role)
 Batman: Arkham Knight (mentioned)
 Lego Dimensions (limited release, Chris Hardwick reprising the role)
 DC Legends (iOS & Google Play game)
 Lego DC Super-Villains (the comic version and the Arrow version)
 Fortnite: Battle Royale (Arrow version skin)

Injustice series
Green Arrow is a playable character in the Injustice fighting games with Alan Tudyk reprising the voice role from Young Justice. If the character is wearing the downloadable Arrow skin, he is voiced by Stephen Amell.

In Injustice: Gods Among Us, Green Arrow is one of the Justice League members taken from the primary universe into an alternate world where Superman and his Regime rule over the planet. They are recruited by that world's Batman into the fight against the tyrannical Superman, whom Oliver discovers has killed his counterpart in this universe. In his playable chapter, Oliver assists Batman and the League in infiltrating the Batcave to retrieve a chunk of kryptonite by defeating the Regime versions Solomon Grundy, Killer Frost, Wonder Woman, and Black Adam. He later helps this world's Batman in rescuing the primary Batman from Stryker's Island, but is forced to battle the alternate Batman when he becomes possessed by Raven. Later, he fights the Regime Flash when the latter finds the Insurgency base to switch sides. After the Insurgency defeats the Regime with the assistance of the primary Superman, he wishes the Regime Flash the best of luck. In his single-player ending, Oliver visits the alternate Star City and finds an arrow-shaped memorial in the deceased Green Arrow's honor. He also mentors this universe's Roy Harper into becoming the city's new protector, Red Arrow.

The Green Arrow in Injustice 2 is from an alternate universe Doctor Fate took Black Canary to after she was defeated by Superman and near death. Just as Dinah lost her Oliver, this Oliver lost his version of Dinah, so Fate left her and her son Connor in this world for the two to find happiness. Five years later, they received news from Doctor Fate of Superman's defeat at the hands of his prime-Earth counterpart. When Dinah is brought home by Doctor Fate to help Batman in restoring Earth, the alternate Oliver joins in to honor his late-counterpart. In the story mode, the couple are sent with Harley Quinn to battle Gorilla Grodd's Society. During their time in Gorilla City, Fate warns them of a bigger threat coming to Earth and offers to take them back to Oliver's home world, but they refuse and defeat him in a fight. After the two defeat Gorilla Grodd, they are abducted by the threat Fate was talking about: Brainiac. They are later brainwashed by Grodd into battling Black Adam and Aquaman in Kahndaq, but are freed after Aquaman kills the Gorilla tyrant. In his single-player ending, Oliver returns to his universe to warn his planet about Brainiac, but arrives in the middle of Brainiac's assault. However, Brainiac was defeated by a multiverse Justice League consisting of variations of Earth-23 Superman, Red Son Batman, and Flashpoint Wonder Woman. He joins them as they go to other universes to combat the multiple versions of Brainiac.

See also
 Speedy in other media

References